Suryaraopet is a locality in Vijayawada of the India state of Andhra Pradesh. It is the Health district of Vijayawada.The area consist of Many super Speciality hospitals. Andhra Pradesh Raj Bhavan also located in this area.
Neighbourhoods in Vijayawada

Demographics
 India census, Suryaraopeta had a population of 19,175. Males constitute 50% of the population and females 50%. Suryaraopeta has an average literacy rate of 76%, higher than the national average of 59.5%: male literacy is 80%, and female literacy is 72%. In Suryaraopeta, 10% of the population is under 6 years of age.

Education
The primary and secondary school education is imparted by government, aided and private schools, under the School Education Department of the state. The medium of instruction followed by different schools are English, Telugu.

References 

Census towns in Andhra Pradesh